The Roman Catholic Church in Benin is composed of 2 ecclesiastical provinces and 8 suffragan dioceses.

List of dioceses

Episcopal Conference of Benin

Ecclesiastical Province of Cotonou 
Archdiocese of Cotonou
Diocese of Abomey
Diocese of Dassa-Zoumé
Diocese of Lokossa
Diocese of Porto Novo

Ecclesiastical Province of Parakou 
Archdiocese of Parakou
Diocese of Djougou
Diocese of Kandi
Diocese of Natitingou
Diocese of N’Dali

External links 
Catholic-Hierarchy entry.
GCatholic.org.

Benin
Catholic dioceses